The crisis in Venezuela is an ongoing socioeconomic and political crisis that began in Venezuela during the presidency of Hugo Chávez and has worsened in Nicolás Maduro's presidency. It has been marked by hyperinflation, escalating starvation, disease, crime and mortality rates, resulting in massive emigration from the country.

The situation is by far the worst economic crisis in Venezuela's history, and is also the worst facing a country in peacetime since the mid-20th century. The crisis is often considered to be more severe than that of the United States during the Great Depression, the 1985–1994 Brazilian economic crisis, or the 2008–2009 hyperinflation in Zimbabwe. Other writers have also compared aspects of the crisis, such as unemployment and GDP contraction, to that of Bosnia and Herzegovina after the 1992–1995 Bosnian War, and those in Russia, Cuba and Albania following the collapse of the Eastern Bloc in 1989 and the dissolution of the Soviet Union in 1991.

On 2 June 2010, Chávez declared an "economic war" due to increasing shortages in Venezuela. The crisis intensified under the Maduro government, growing more severe as a result of low oil prices in early 2015, and a drop in Venezuela's oil production from lack of maintenance and investment. In January 2016, the opposition-led National Assembly declared a "health humanitarian crisis".  The government failed to cut spending in the face of falling oil revenues, and has dealt with the crisis by denying its existence and violently repressing opposition. Extrajudicial killings by the Venezuelan government became common, with the United Nations (UN) reporting 5,287 killings by the Special Action Forces in 2017, with at least another 1,569 killings recorded in the first six months of 2019, stating that some of the killings were "done as a reprisal for [the victims'] participation in anti-government demonstrations."

Political corruption, chronic shortages of food and medicine, closure of businesses, unemployment, deterioration of productivity, authoritarianism, human rights violations, gross economic mismanagement and high dependence on oil have also contributed to the worsening crisis.

As a response to human rights abuses, the degradation in the rule of law, and corruption, the European Union, the Lima Group, the United States and other countries have applied individual sanctions against government officials and members of both the military and security forces. The United States would later extend its sanctions to the petroleum sector. Supporters of Chávez and Maduro have said that the problems result from an "economic war" on Venezuela and "falling oil prices, international sanctions, and the country's business elite", while critics of the government say the cause is "years of economic mismanagement, and corruption." Most observers cite anti-democratic governance, corruption, and mismanagement of the economy as causes of the crisis. Others attribute the crisis to the "socialist", "populist" or "hyper-populist" nature of the government's policies and the use of these policies to maintain political power. National and international analysts and economists have stated that the crisis is not the result of a conflict, natural disaster, or sanctions, but rather of the consequences of populist policies and corrupt practices that began under the Chávez administration's Bolivarian Revolution and continued under the Maduro administration.

The crisis has affected the life of the average Venezuelan on all levels. By 2017, hunger had escalated to the point where almost seventy-five percent of the population had lost an average of over 8 kg (over 19 lbs) in weight and more than half did not have enough income to meet their basic food needs. A UN report estimated in March 2019 that 94% of Venezuelans lived in poverty, and by 2021 almost twenty percent of Venezuelans (5.4 million) had left their country. The UN analysis estimates in 2019 that 25% of Venezuelans need some form of humanitarian assistance. Venezuela led the world in murder rates, with 81.4 per 100,000 people killed in 2018, making it the third most violent country in the world. Following increased international sanctions throughout 2019, the Maduro government abandoned policies established by Chávez such as price and currency controls, which resulted in the country seeing a temporary rebound from economic decline before COVID-19 entered Venezuela the following year. As a response to the devaluation of the official bolívar currency, by 2019 the population increasingly started relying on US dollars for transactions.

According to the national Living Conditions Survey (ENCOVI), by 2021 94.5% of the population was living in poverty based on income, out of which 76.6% lived under extreme poverty, the highest figure ever recorded in the country.

Background

Chávez presidency
After attempting a coup d'état in 1992 and being pardoned by President Rafael Caldera, Hugo Chávez was elected president and maintained the presidency from 1999 until his death in 2013. Increasing oil prices in the early 2000s led to levels of funds not seen in Venezuela since the 1980s. Chávez established Bolivarian missions, aimed at providing public services to improve economic, cultural, and social conditions. According to Corrales and Penfold, "aid was disbursed to some of the poor and, more gravely, in a way that ended up helping the president and his allies and cronies more than anyone else". Nonetheless, poverty was cut more than 20 percent between 2002 and 2008. The Missions entailed the construction of thousands of free medical clinics for the poor, and the enactment of food and housing subsidies. A 2010 OAS report indicated achievements in addressing illiteracy, healthcare and poverty, and economic and social advances. The quality of life for Venezuelans had also improved according to a UN Index. Teresa A. Meade wrote that Chávez's popularity strongly depended "on the lower classes who have benefited from these health initiatives and similar policies." According to Chosun Ilbo, Venezuela began to face economic difficulties due to Chávez's populist policies. On 2 June 2010, Chávez declared an "economic war" due to increasing shortages in Venezuela.

Political corruption, chronic shortages of food and medicine, closure of businesses, unemployment, deterioration of productivity, authoritarianism, human rights violations, gross economic mismanagement and high dependence on oil have also contributed to the worsening crisis.

The social works initiated by Chávez's government relied on oil products, the keystone of the Venezuelan economy, leading to Dutch disease according to Javier Corrales. By the early 2010s, economic actions taken by Chávez's government during the preceding decade, such as overspending and price controls, became unsustainable. Venezuela's economy faltered while poverty, inflation and shortages in Venezuela increased. According to Martinez Lázaro, professor of economics at the IE Business School in Madrid, the economic woes Venezuela continued to suffer under Maduro would have occurred even if Chávez were still in power. In early 2013, shortly after Chávez's death, Foreign Policy stated that whoever succeeded Chávez would "inherit one of the most dysfunctional economies in the Americas—and just as the bill for the deceased leader's policies comes due."

Maduro presidency

Following Chávez's death in 2013, Nicolás Maduro became president after defeating his opponent Henrique Capriles Radonski by 235,000 votes, a 1.5% margin. Maduro continued most of the existing economic policies of his predecessor Chávez. Upon entering the presidency, his administration faced a high inflation rate and large shortages of goods, problems left over from Chávez's policies.

Maduro said capitalist speculation had driven high rates of inflation and created widespread shortages of basic necessities. He enacted economic measures against political opponents, who he and loyalists stated were behind an international economic conspiracy. Maduro was criticized for concentrating on public opinion, instead of tending to practical issues which economists had warned about, or creating ideas to improve Venezuela's economic prospects.

By 2014, Venezuela had entered an economic recession and by 2016, the country had an inflation rate of 800%, the highest in its history.

The crisis intensified under the Maduro government, growing more severe as a result of low oil prices in early 2015, and a drop in Venezuela's oil production from lack of maintenance and investment. The government failed to cut spending in the face of falling oil revenues, and has dealt with the crisis by denying its existence and violently repressing opposition. Extrajudicial killings by the Venezuelan government became common, with the United Nations (UN) reporting 5,287 killings by the Special Action Forces (FAES) in 2017, with at least another 1,569 killings recorded in the first six months of 2019; the UN had "reasonable grounds to believe that many of these killings constitute extrajudicial executions" and characterized the security operations as "aimed at neutralizing, repressing and criminalizing political opponents and people critical of the government". The UN also stated that the Special Action Forces "would plant arms and drugs and fire their weapons against the walls or in the air to suggest a confrontation and to show the victim had resisted authority" and that some of the killings were "done as a reprisal for [the victims'] participation in anti-government demonstrations."

In January 2016, the National Assembly declared a "health humanitarian crisis" given the "serious shortage of medicines, medical supplies and deterioration of humanitarian infrastructure", asking Maduro's government to "guarantee immediate access to the list of essential medicines that are basic and indispensable and that must be accessible at all times." In August, Secretary-General of the United Nations Ban Ki-moon declared that there was a humanitarian crisis in Venezuela caused by the lack of basic needs, including food, water, sanitation and clothing. Before the 2019 presidential crisis, the Maduro government denied several offers of aid, stating that there was not a humanitarian crisis and that such claims were used to justify foreign intervention. Maduro's refusal of aid worsened the effects of Venezuela's crisis.

In March 2019, The Wall Street Journal said that "Mr. Maduro has long used food and other government handouts to pressure impoverished Venezuelans to attend pro-government rallies and to support him during elections as the country's economic meltdown has intensified." In 2019, The Economist wrote that the Maduro government had obtained "extra money from selling gold (both from illegal mines and from its reserves) and narcotics".

Elections and protests since 2017

Since 2010, Venezuela has been suffering a socioeconomic crisis under Maduro, and briefly under his predecessor, Chávez. As a result of discontent with the government, in the 2015 parliamentary election the opposition was elected to the majority in the National Assembly, after which the outgoing (lame duck) National Assembly—consisting of Bolivarian officials—filled the Supreme Tribunal of Justice, the highest court in Venezuela, with Maduro allies.

Maduro disavowed the National Assembly in 2017 leading to the 2017 Venezuelan constitutional crisis; as of 2018, some considered the National Assembly the only "legitimate" institution left in the country, and human rights organizations said there were no independent institutional checks on presidential power. Following the constitutional crisis and the push to ban opposition presidential candidate Henrique Capriles from politics for 15 years, protests grew to their most "combative" since they began in 2014. During the protests, the Mother of all Protests involved between 2.5 million and 6 million protesters. On 1 May 2017 following a month of protests that resulted in at least 29 dead, Maduro called for a constituent assembly that would draft a new constitution to replace the 1999 Venezuela Constitution created under Chávez. He invoked Article 347, and stated that his call for a new constitution was necessary to counter the actions of the opposition. The members of the Constituent Assembly would not be elected in open elections, but selected from social organizations loyal to Maduro. It would also allow him to stay in power during the interregnum and skip the 2018 presidential elections, as the process would take at least two years.
 
Many countries considered these actions a bid by Maduro to stay in power indefinitely, and over 40 countries stated that they would not recognize the 2017 Constituent National Assembly (ANC), along with supranational bodies such as the European Union, Mercosur and the OAS. The Democratic Unity Roundtable—the opposition to the incumbent ruling party—boycotted the election, saying that the ANC was "a trick to keep [the incumbent ruling party] in power". Since the opposition did not participate in the election, the incumbent Great Patriotic Pole, dominated by the United Socialist Party of Venezuela, won almost all seats in the assembly by default. Maduro's allies—such as Bolivia, El Salvador, Cuba, Nicaragua, Russia and Syria—discouraged foreign intervention in Venezuelan politics and congratulated the president.

The ANC was sworn in on 4 August 2017, and the next day declared itself to be the government branch with supreme power in Venezuela, banning the opposition-led National Assembly from performing actions that would interfere with the assembly while continuing to pass measures in "support and solidarity" with President Maduro, effectively stripping the National Assembly of all its powers.

In February 2018 Maduro called presidential elections, four months before the prescribed date. There were many irregularities, including the banning from standing of several major opposition parties. Maduro was declared the winner in May 2018. Many said the elections were invalid. Politicians both internally and internationally said Maduro was not legitimately elected, and considered him an ineffective dictator. In the months leading up to his 10 January 2019 inauguration, Maduro was pressured to step down by nations and bodies including the Lima Group (excluding Mexico), the United States, and the OAS; this pressure was increased after the new National Assembly of Venezuela was sworn in on 5 January 2019.

The 2019 presidential crisis came to a head when the National Assembly stated that the results of the May 2018 presidential election were invalid and declared National Assembly president Juan Guaidó to be the acting president, citing several clauses of the 1999 Venezuelan Constitution.

Corruption

Corruption is high in Venezuela according to the Transparency International Corruption Perceptions Index and is prevalent at many levels of society. While corruption is difficult to measure reliably, in 2018 Transparency International ranked Venezuela among the top 13 most corrupt countries out of 180 measured, tied with Iraq, but ahead of Afghanistan, Burundi, Equatorial Guinea, Guinea, North Korea, Libya, Somalia, South Sudan, Sudan, Syria and Yemen. A 2016 poll found that 73% of Venezuelans believed their police were corrupt. Latinobarómetro's 2018 report said that 65% of Venezuelans believed their president was involved in corruption, and 64% believed that government officials were corrupt. Discontent with corruption was cited by opposition-aligned groups as one of the reasons for the 2014 Venezuelan protests. A once wealthy country, Venezuela's economy was driven into political and economic crisis by corruption and mismanagement.

Basic needs

Poverty 
The Wall Street Journal reported in March 2019 that poverty was double that of 2014. A study from Andrés Bello Catholic University indicated that by 2019 at least 8 million Venezuelans did not have enough to eat. A UN report estimated in March 2019 that 94% of Venezuelans live in poverty, and that one quarter of Venezuelans need some form of humanitarian assistance.

According to the Living Conditions Survey by the Andrés Bello Catholic University (Encovi in Spanish, Encuesta de Condiciones de Vida), by 2021 94.5% of the population was in poverty based on income, out of which 76.6% lived under extreme poverty, the highest figure ever recorded in the country.

Food and water 

More than 70% of Venezuela's food is imported; Venezuela became so dependent on food imports that it could no longer afford when the price of oil dropped in 2014. According to Al Jazeera, Chávez gave the military control of food, and nationalized much of the industry, which was then neglected, leading to production shortages. With a "diminished food supply", Maduro put "generals in charge of everything from butter to rice". With the military in charge of food, food trafficking became profitable, bribes and corruption common, and food did not reach the needy. The government imports most of the food the country needs, it is controlled by the military, and the price paid for food is higher than justified by market prices. Venezuelans were spending "all day waiting in lines" to buy rationed food, "pediatric wards filled up with underweight children, and formerly middle-class adults began picking through rubbish bins for scraps", according to Al Jazeera.

Several other factors have led to shortages: imports over the two years until the end of 2017 declined by two-thirds; hyperinflation has made food too costly for many Venezuelans; and for those who depend on food boxes supplied by the government, "these do not reach all Venezuelans who need them, provision of boxes is intermittent, and receipt is often linked to political support of the government".

Corruption became a problem in the distribution of food. The operations director at one food import business says "he pays off a long roster of military officials for each shipment of food he brings in from ... the US. It's an unbroken chain of bribery from when your ship comes in until the food is driven out in trucks." A National Guard lieutenant denies this charge, saying corruption would be worse if the military were not involved; government and military officials say the opposition is overstating the corruption problem for their own benefit. Retired General Antonio Rivero said that "Maduro is trying to prevent soldiers from going hungry and being tempted to participate in an uprising against an increasingly unpopular government", adding that using the military to control food distribution has "drained the feeling of rebellion from the armed forces" by giving soldiers access to food denied others, with the resulting corruption increasing shortages for the general public.

The colectivos are also involved in food trafficking, selling food on the black market; a colectivo leader told InSight Crime that trafficking food and medicine is as profitable as drug-running, but carries less risk. With shadowy connections to the government, The Washington Post says "some have been put in charge of the distribution of government food packages in poor areas—giving them control over hungry neighborhoods."

The Associated Press reports that people gather every evening in downtown Caracas in search of food thrown out on a sidewalk; the people are typically unemployed, but are "frequently joined by small business owners, college students and pensioners—people who consider themselves middle class even though their living standards have long ago been pulverized by triple-digit inflation, food shortages and a collapsing currency". A waste collection official in Maracaibo reported that most of the trash bags he received had been gone through by people searching for food. One dump reports finding parts of dismembered animals, like "dogs, cats, donkeys, horses and pigeons" and there is evidence that people are eating wildlife such as anteaters, flamingos, vultures and lizards.

"Hunger, malnutrition, and severe food shortages are widespread in all Venezuela", according to Human Rights Watch. Doctors at 21 public hospitals in 17 Venezuelan states told The New York Times in 2017 that "their emergency rooms were being overwhelmed by children with severe malnutrition—a condition they had rarely encountered before the economic crisis began", and that "hundreds have died". The government has responded with "a near-total blackout of health statistics, and by creating a culture in which doctors are often afraid to register cases and deaths that may be associated with the government's failures".

The Food and Agriculture Organization of the UN said that less than 5% of Venezuelans were undernourished between 2008 and 2013, but that number had more than doubled, to almost 12% from 2015 and 2017, representing 3.7 million people. A 2016 survey found that almost three-quarters of the population said that, because of improper nutrition, they had lost on average 8.7 kg (19.4 lbs) and 64% said they lost 11 kg (24 lbs) in 2017. A 2016 Venebarometro poll of 1,200 Venezuelans found almost half are no longer able to eat three daily meals; the government blames this on an "economic war" they say is waged by the opposition.

A UN report said that because of lack of water and sanitation, 4.3 million Venezuelans needed assistance in 2019.

During the 2019 Venezuelan blackouts which started on 7 March, the water distribution system also had shortages. José de Viana, an engineer and former president of Hidrocapital, the municipal water company in Caracas, said that 90% of the thermoelectric plants that work as a backup if power fails are not operational because of lack of maintenance, or they have been simply disconnected, and that "the most important population centers in the country [had] zero water supply for more than four days". According to The Washington Post, analysts said that two-thirds of Venezuela's population (20 million people) were without water, partially or completely, in the weeks after the blackouts. People swarmed the polluted Guaire River in the center of Caracas to fill plastic containers with contaminated water, or collected water from streams at El Ávila National Park. Others tried to catch water from the city's sewer drains. In the state of Lara people bathed in the sewers. The head of the infectious disease department at the University Hospital of Caracas, María Eugenia Landaeta said that, without access to clean water, the chance of people contracting bacterial infections increased, and that doctors had seen during the blackouts "surges in diarrhea, typhoid fever and hepatitis A", while non-sterile water and lack of hygiene was contributing to postpartum infections. The University Hospital goes months without dependable water or power supply, and depends on water tanks and power generators.

The crisis has affected the life of the average Venezuelan on all levels. By 2017, hunger had escalated to the point where almost seventy-five percent of the population had lost an average of over 8 kg (over 19 lbs) in weight and more than half did not have enough income to meet their basic food needs. An UN report estimated in March 2019 that 94% of Venezuelans lived in poverty, and by 2021 almost twenty percent of Venezuelans (5.4 million) had left their country. The UN analysis estimates in 2019 that 25% of Venezuelans need some form of humanitarian assistance. Venezuela led the world in murder rates, with 81.4 per 100,000 people killed in 2018, making it the third most violent country in the world. Following increased international sanctions throughout 2019, the Maduro government abandoned policies established by Chávez such as price and currency controls, which resulted in the country seeing a temporary rebound from economic decline before COVID-19 entered Venezuela the following year. As a response to the devaluation of the official bolívar currency, by 2019 the population increasingly started relying on US dollars for transactions. Maduro described dollarization as an "escape valve" that helps the recovery of the country, the spread of productive forces in the country and the economy. However, Maduro said that the Venezuelan bolívar remained as the national currency.

Health care 

During the Bolivarian Revolution, the government began providing free healthcare, with Cuban medical professionals providing aid. The government's failure to concentrate on healthcare and a reduction in spending on healthcare, along with unchecked government corruption resulted in avoidable deaths due to severe shortages of medical supplies and equipment, and the emigration of medical professionals to other countries.

Venezuela's reliance on imported goods and the complicated exchange rates initiated under Chávez led to increasing shortages during the late 2000s and into the 2010s that affected the availability of medicines and medical equipment in the country. Associated Press says the government stopped publishing medical statistics in 2010. The Health Minister changed multiple times during Chávez's presidency. According to a high-ranking official of Venezuela's Health Ministry, the ministers were treated as scapegoats whenever issues with public health arose in Venezuela. He also said that officials of the Health Ministry engaged in corruption to enrich themselves by selling goods intended for public healthcare to others.

Early in the Maduro presidency, the government could not supply enough money for medical supplies among healthcare providers, with the president of the Venezuelan Medical Federation saying that 9 of 10 large hospitals had only 7% of required supplies and private doctors reporting numbers of patients that are "impossible" to count "dying from easily treatable illnesses when Venezuela's downward economic slide accelerated after Chávez's death". Many Venezuelans died avoidable deaths with medical professionals having scarce resources and using methods that were replaced decades ago. In February 2014, doctors at the University of Caracas Medical Hospital stopped performing surgeries due to the lack of supplies, even though nearly 3,000 people required surgery.

By early 2015, only 35% of hospital beds were available and 50% of operating rooms could not function due to the lack of resources. In March 2015, a Venezuelan NGO, Red de Medicos por la Salud, reported that there was a 68% shortage of surgical supplies and a 70% shortage of medicines in Venezuelan pharmacies. In 2018, the Pan American Health Organization (PAHO) reported that approximately one-third (22,000 of 66,138) of registered physicians left Venezuela as of 2014. Rosemary DiCarlo from the UN said that 40% of medical professionals had left Venezuela and supplies of medicine were at 20% of levels needed. The Venezuelan Medical Federation said that doctors were leaving the public health care system because of shortages of drugs and equipment and poor pay. In August 2015 Human Rights Watch said "We have rarely seen access to essential medicines deteriorate as quickly as it has in Venezuela except in war zones." In 2015, the government reported that a third of patients admitted to public hospitals died. The medications of individuals who die are re-distributed through small-scale and local efforts, with the help of the families of the deceased, to try to supply surviving patients.

One study of 6,500 households by three of the main universities in Venezuela found that "74% of the population had lost on average nineteen pounds in 2016". In April 2017 Venezuela's health ministry reported that maternal mortality jumped by 65% in 2016 and that the number of infant deaths rose by 30%. It also said that the number of cases of malaria was up by 76%. Shortly after Minister of Health Antonieta Caporale released in 2017 this data, and health statistics showing increases in 2016 infant and maternal mortality and infectious diseases, Maduro fired her and replaced the physician with a pharmacist close to vice-president Tareck El Aissami, Luis López Chejade. The publications were removed from the Ministry's website, and no further health data has been made available, although the government had produced health bulletins for several decades.

In March 2019, The Wall Street Journal reported that the "collapse of Venezuela's health system, once one of the best in Latin America, has led to a surge in infant and maternal mortality rates and a return of rare diseases that were considered all but eradicated. Health officials say malaria, yellow fever, diphtheria, dengue and tuberculosis are now spreading from Venezuela to neighboring countries as Venezuelan refugees surge over borders." The United Nations estimated in 2019 that 2.8 million Venezuelans have healthcare needs, 300,000 are at risk of dying with cancer, diabetes or HIV as they have not had access to medicine for more than a year, and preventable diseases like diphtheria, malaria, measles and tuberculosis are rising in 2019, along with hepatitis A, because of sanitation and lack of access to water. The April 2019 HRW/Johns Hopkins report showed this rise in infectious and preventable diseases, as well as increasing malnutrition, infant and maternal death, and undertreatment of HIV. Inflation and medicine shortages have meant that patients are asked to bring their own food, water and soap, and medical supplies including scalpels and syringes. In August 2019, as part of regional efforts to help Venezuelan migrants, the United States promised that it will provide thousands of doses of HIV medication to prevent the spread of HIV/AIDS and to treat those who have it.

2019 Human Rights Watch/Johns Hopkins report 

In April 2019, Human Rights Watch (HRW) and Johns Hopkins Bloomberg School of Public Health published the results of a joint, year-long research project in a report entitled "Venezuela's humanitarian emergency: Large-scale UN response needed to address health and food crises". Combined with data from the World Health Organization (WHO), the PAHO and Venezuelan sources, the report was based on 156 interviews with Venezuelan emigrants to Colombia and Brazil, officials from relief and humanitarian organizations, Venezuelan health care professionals, and UN and government officials from Brazil and Colombia. Most of the interviews occurred in July or August 2018 in visits by the experts to the Venezuelan border towns of Cúcuta, Colombia and Boa Vista or Pacaraima, Brazil.

The Washington Post stated that the HRW/Johns Hopkins report "paints an extremely grim picture of life in Venezuela, whose once-prosperous economy has imploded because of mismanagement and corruption under Maduro"; it documents rising maternal and infant death, spread of preventable diseases, food insecurity, and child malnutrition. HRW declared that the "combination of severe medicine and food shortages ... with the spread of disease ... amounts to a complex humanitarian emergency that requires a full-scale response by the United Nations secretary-general." The Washington Post states that the report describes a healthcare system that is in "utter collapse", with diseases that are preventable via vaccination spreading, and "dramatic surges" in infectious diseases once eradicated in Venezuela.

According to NPR, the economic crisis in Venezuela started in 2010, and the health crisis followed by two years and significantly worsened in 2017, but the situation in 2019 "is even more dismal than researchers expected". Paul Spiegel, MD, who was the editor and reviewer of the report said, "Venezuela is a middle-income country with a previously strong infrastructure, so just to see this incredible decline ... in such a short period of time is quite astonishing." Alberto Paniz-Mondolfi, a doctor in Barquisimeto, Venezuela who is a member of the Venezuelan National Academy of Medicine, told NPR that the report gave an accurate, thorough and timely depiction of the medical situation in his country; he had no affiliation with the report, but said that he had seen cases where there were not even catheters for hooking up children who appeared to have malnutrition for intravenous therapy. Spiegel adds that, because of the infrastructure and trained personnel in Venezuela, aid can be distributed quickly once delivered to Venezuela.

Maduro administration response

The Maduro administration does not publish health statistics, but NPR states that it "paint[s] a rosy picture of its health care system". The Guardian reported Maduro's response to the country's health care crisis as "inadequate". According to The Washington Post, "because of the intransigence of President Nicolás Maduro—who has blamed deprivations on US sanctions and refused to allow anything beyond a trickle of assistance to enter the country"—aid has not been delivered quickly enough. Reuters reported that "Maduro says there is no crisis and no need for humanitarian aid, blaming U.S. sanctions for the country's economic problems." Venezuela's Foreign Minister Jorge Arreaza did not respond to a letter asking for Venezuela's "views regarding the extent of the crisis and the policies it was implementing to address it" before the HRW/Johns Hopkins report was published.

The HRW summary of the HRW/Johns Hopkins report said, "The Venezuelan authorities during the presidency of Nicolás Maduro have proven unable to stem the crisis, and have in fact exacerbated it through their efforts to suppress information about the scale and urgency of the problems." The Associated Press said Maduro "suppress[es] information" and has made the problem worse. The Americas director for HRW, José Miguel Vivanco said, "Venezuelan authorities publicly minimise and suppress information about the crisis, and harass and retaliate against those who collect data or speak out about it, while also doing far too little to alleviate it." The report discusses a teaching physician who said "residents are threatened with being expelled from the program or their hospital if they include a malnutrition diagnosis in medical records", causing malnutrition to be understated in Venezuelan data.

The report states that "many analysts have argued that the government's own policies have played a role in causing the economic crisis ... However, under the presidency of Nicolás Maduro, the Venezuelan government has denied the crisis, hidden health statistics and data, harassed health professionals who speak out about the reality on the ground, and made it harder for sufficient humanitarian assistance to reach the Venezuelan people. Through these policies and practices, authorities have contributed to the worsening humanitarian crisis documented in this report." The International Covenant on Economic, Social and Cultural Rights (ICESCR) is a multilateral treaty ratified by Venezuela; it commits its parties to "the enjoyment of the highest attainable standard of physical and mental health", and the right to an adequate "standard of living" and "adequate food". The Constitution of Venezuela provides for the right to health. The HRW/Johns Hopkins report states that, facing deteriorating health conditions, the government's suppression of information and actions against those speaking about the crisis "represent a violation of Venezuela's obligations to respect, protect, and fulfill the right to health" to which Venezuelans are entitled from both the ICESCR treaty and their Constitution.

Following the April HRW/Johns Hopkins report, and amid announcements from the United Nations about the scale of the humanitarian crisis, along with increasing international pressure, Maduro met with the Red Cross, and it announced it would triple its budget for aid to Venezuela. The increased aid would focus in four areas: the migration crisis, the health care system collapse, water and sanitation, and prisons and detention centers. Maduro, for the first time, indicated he was prepared to accept international aid—although denying a humanitarian crisis exists. The Wall Street Journal said that the acceptance of humanitarian shipments by Maduro was his first acknowledgement that Venezuela is "suffering from an economic collapse", and The Guardian reported that Maduro's stance has softened in the face of increasing pressure. Guaidó said the acceptance of humanitarian aid was the "result of our pressure and insistence", and called on Venezuelans to "stay vigilant to make sure incoming aid is not diverted for 'corrupt' purposes".

Infectious and preventable diseases 

In 1961, Venezuela was the first country declared free of malaria. In 2009, the WHO reported there were less than 36,000 cases of malaria in Venezuela. In 2013, Venezuela registered a new high in the number of cases of malaria in the past 50 years, and by 2014, was the only country in Latin America where the incidence of malaria was increasing, allegedly in part due to illegal mining; medical shortages in the country hampered treatment. By 2016, Venezuela's malaria-prevention program had collapsed, and there were more than a hundred thousand cases of malaria yearly. In 2017, there were 414,000 confirmed cases of malaria, according to the WHO.

Other preventable diseases that "were rare or nonexistent before the economic crisis, have surged", including diphtheria, measles, and tuberculosis. "Venezuela did not experience a single case of diphtheria between 2006 and 2015"; according to the HRW/Johns Hopkins report, since mid-2016, 1,500 of the 2,500 suspected cases have been confirmed. Between 2008 and 2015, there was one recorded case of measles, in 2012; since June 2017, 6,200 of the 9,300 reported cases have been confirmed. The highest rate of tuberculosis in four decades was reached in 2017. In 2014, there were 6,000 reported cases of tuberculosis; preliminary data shows more than 13,000 for 2017.

In 2014, shortages of antiretroviral medicines to treat HIV/AIDS affected about 50,000 Venezuelans, potentially causing thousands of Venezuelans with HIV to develop AIDS. In 2018, PAHO estimated that 90% of Venezuelans who had HIV and were registered by the government—69,308 of the 79,467 registered—were not receiving antiretroviral treatment. The PAHO report estimated that in six years, new HIV cases grew by 24% through 2016, after which the government stopped providing data. NPR reported: "New HIV infections and AIDS-related deaths have increased sharply, in large part because the vast majority of HIV-positive Venezuelans no longer have access to antiretroviral medications." Because of a shortage of HIV test kits, there may be more people who have HIV but are not aware. The HRW/Johns Hopkins report says: "Venezuela is the only country in the world where large numbers of individuals living with HIV have been forced to discontinue their treatment as a result of the lack of availability of antiretroviral (ARV) medicines."

In late 2014, Venezuelans began saying that due to shortages of medicines, it was hard to find acetaminophen to help alleviate symptoms of the newly introduced chikungunya virus, a potentially lethal mosquito-borne disease. In September 2014, the Venezuelan government stated that 400 Venezuelans were infected with chikungunya; the Central University of Venezuela stated that there could be between 65,000 and 117,000 Venezuelans infected. In August 2015 independent health monitors said that there were more than two million people infected with chikungunya while the government said there were 36,000 cases.

COVID-19 pandemic 

As a result of the COVID-19 pandemic, which reached Venezuela in March 2020, costs for services such as internet and telephone lines rose between 80% and 749%, further limiting access to these utilities. Shortages of beds and essential medical equipment, such as latex gloves and antibiotics, have severely limited the capabilities of the country's medical infrastructure.

In April 2020 the Venezuelan government asked the Bank of England to sell $US1.02 billion of the Venezuelan gold reserves held by the bank to help the government fund its response to the COVID-19 pandemic. This was followed on 14 May by a legal claim by the Venezuelan Central Bank (BCV) asking the Bank of England to send the proceeds of the sale of gold to the United Nations Development Programme. The claim stated that the funds would then be used to buy healthcare equipment, medicine, and food to address the country's "COVID-19 emergency". The UK Foreign Office had previously agreed to a request from the Trump administration to block the release of Venezuela's gold. In July 2020, the UK High Court ruled that the gold could not be released to the BCV because the UK government recognised Juan Guaidó as the "constitutional interim president of Venezuela". However, in October 2020, an appeals court overturned the High Court decision and asked the UK Foreign Office to clarify who it recognised as president of Venezuela. The Guardian wrote that the position of the UK government was unclear as it "maintains full consular and diplomatic relations with the Venezuela government".

Women, maternal and infant 
In 2016, infant mortality increased 30% in one year, to 11,466 deaths of children under the age of one. By 2019, the UN reported that infant mortality had "soared". "Venezuela is the only South American country where infant mortality has returned to levels last seen in the 1990s", according to the HRW/Johns Hopkins report. Maternal mortality also increased 65% in one year, to 756 deaths.

Abortion is illegal in Venezuela; the director of a large family planning clinic in Venezuela indicated that more women are arranging for permanent sterilization, and that more are presenting with "complications from clandestine abortions". One of the causes, according to the Venezuelan Association for Alternative Sexual Education, is the severe shortage of oral and injectable contraceptives and intrauterine devices.

The HRW/Johns Hopkins report states that the more than 454,000 Venezuelan women who have emigrated to Colombia face 'threats of sexual exploitation and abuse, trafficking, and sexual and reproductive rights violations"; violence based on gender accounted for more than 12% of 2018 health-care events, and indigenous women may be at higher risk.

Venezuelan women emigrating are at risk for becoming sex trafficking targets virtually anywhere they flee to. Cases of trafficking in Peru, the United States, Spain, and Colombia display the highest numbers.

Pregnancy and motherhood
Due to lack of medical supplies, food and medical care in Venezuelan hospitals, many pregnant women in Venezuela are crossing the border into neighboring countries to give birth. Lack of basic medicine and equipment is causing preventable deaths and maternity is a very high risk for women—especially, since there are no blood banks in the event of excessive bleeding Hospitals frequently have water and electricity outages and only 7% of emergency services are fully operative. Maternal mortality is estimated to have increased by 65% from 2013 to 2016, and unsafe abortions have contributed to 20% of preventable maternal deaths. According to Amnesty International, causes of the increase in maternal deaths include a lack of medical personnel and supplies like anticoagulants, scar healing cream, painkillers, antibiotics, antiseptics, and other tools and equipment.

Statelessness 
Cúcuta, a city on the Colombian-Venezuela border, has received 14,000 Venezuelan patients at the Erasmo Meoz University Hospital since 2016 and is expecting to receive even more. In this hospital, 75% percent of the newborns born in the first two months of the year 2019 were Venezuelans. The situation has strained the budget of these hospitals, putting Erasmo Meoz 14 million dollars into debt. While Colombia is the most impacted since it shares a border, women are also traveling to Brazil to give birth. The number of births of Venezuelan babies attended to in Boa Vista, Brazil, has increased from 700 in 2014 to 50,000 in 2017. Venezuelan mothers have also been fleeing to neighboring Peru and Ecuador. For Colombian citizenship it is required that Colombian citizens be born to at least one Colombian parent or be born to foreign parents who meet residence requirements and are eligible to become citizens. Due to the influx of Venezuelan babies being born in Colombia and the Venezuelan government's inability to issue citizenship, Colombia has introduced a new measure that will give these Colombian-born newborns Colombian citizenship to avoid 'statelessness'. The measure went into effect August 2019 and includes babies of Venezuelan parents born in Colombia starting in January 2015, having given citizenship to approximately 27,000 babies born in Colombia over the past four years.

Mental health 
Following the Bolivarian Revolution, the rate of suicide among Venezuelans quadrupled over two decades, with hundreds of thousands of Venezuelans dying from suicide during the period according to the Venezuelan Observatory of Violence. As a result of the crisis, stressors resulting in suicide included economic burden, hunger and loneliness due to the emigration of relatives.

In 2015, concerns about shortages and inflation overtook violent crime as Venezuelans' main worry for the first time in years according to pollster Datanálisis. The chief executive of Datanálisis, Luis Vicente Leon, said that Venezuelans had greater concerns over shortages and became preoccupied with the difficulties surrounding them instead. Eldar Shafir, author and American behavioral scientist, said that the psychological "obsession" with finding scarce goods in Venezuela is because the rarity of the item makes it "precious".

In 2016, reporters from The New York Times visited six psychiatric wards across the Venezuela at the invitation of doctors; all reported shortages of medicine and even food. In the investigation, they reported that El Pampero Hospital had not employed a psychiatrist in two years, and that it only had running water for only a few hours a day. The hospital, the article said, also suffered from shortages of basic personal-care and cleaning supplies, such as soap, shampoo, toothpaste or toilet paper. The nurses declared that without sedatives, they had to restrain patients or lock them in isolation cells to keep them from harming themselves. The reporters also noted that the government had denied that its public hospitals were suffering from shortages, and had refused multiple offers of international medical aid.

Despite the threat of violent protests, the economic crisis affected children more than violence. Abel Saraiba, a psychologist with children's rights organization Cecodap said in 2017, "We have children from a very early age who are having to think about how to survive", with half of her young clients requiring treatment because of the crisis. Children are often forced to stand in food lines or beg with their parents, while the games they play with other children revolve around finding food. Friends of the Child Foundation psychologist Ninoska Zambrano said that children are offering sexual services for food. Zambrano said "Families are doing things that not only lead them to break physically, but in general, socially, we are being morally broken".

In 2017, suicide increased by 67% among the elderly and 18% among minors; by 2018, reports emerged of a rapidly increasing suicide rate due to the stressors surrounding the crisis.

Medical care and elections 
Mission Barrio Adentro was a program established by Chávez to bring medical care to poor neighborhoods; it was staffed by Cubans that were sent to Venezuela in exchange for petroleum. The New York Times interviewed sixteen Cuban medical professionals in 2019 who had worked for Barrio Adentro prior to the 2018 Venezuelan presidential elections; all sixteen revealed that they were required to participate in voting fraud. Some of the Cubans said that "command centers" for elections were placed near clinics to facilitate "dispatching doctors to pressure residents". Some tactics reported by the Cubans were unrelated to their profession: they were given counterfeit cards to vote even though they were not eligible voters, they witnessed vote tampering when officials opening ballot boxes and destroyed ballots, and they were told to instruct easily manipulated elderly patients in how to vote.

But they also "described a system of deliberate political manipulation"; their services as medical professionals "were wielded to secure votes for the governing Socialist Party, often through coercion", they told The New York Times. Facing a shortage of supplies and medicine, they were instructed to withhold treatment–even for emergencies–so supplies and treatment could be "doled out closer to the election, part of a national strategy to compel patients to vote for the government". They reported that life-saving treatment was denied to patients who supported the opposition. As the election neared, they were sent door-to-door, on house visits with a political purpose: "to hand out medicine and enlist voters for Venezuela's Socialist Party". Patients were warned that they could lose their medical care if they did not vote for the socialist party, and that, if Maduro lost, ties would be broken with Cuba, and Venezuelans would lose all medical care. Patients with chronic conditions, at risk of death if they couldn't get medicine, were a particular focus of these tactics. One said that government officials were posing as doctors to make these house calls before elections; 'We, the doctors, were asked to give our extra robes to people. The fake doctors were even giving out medicines, without knowing what they were or how to use them," he said.

Housing

Since the mid-2000s during Chávez's presidency, Venezuela has had a housing crisis. In 2005, the Venezuelan Construction Chamber (CVC) estimated that there was a shortage of 1.6 million homes, with only 10,000 of 120,000 promised homes constructed by Chávez's government despite billions of dollars in investments. Poor Venezuelans attempted to construct homes on their own despite structural risks.

By 2011, there was a housing shortage of 2 million homes, with nearly twenty prime developments being occupied by squatters following Chávez's call for the poor to occupy "unused land". Up to 2011, only 500,000 homes were constructed during the Chávez administration, with over two-thirds of the new housing developments being built by private companies; his government provided about the same amount of housing as previous administrations. Housing shortages were further exacerbated when private construction halted due to the fear of property expropriations and because of the government's inability to construct and provide housing. Urban theorist and author Mike Davis said in July 2011 to The Guardian, "Despite official rhetoric, the Bolivarianist regime has undertaken no serious redistribution of wealth in the cities and oil revenues pay for too many other programmes and subsidies to leave room for new housing construction." By 2012, a shortage of building materials also disrupted construction, with metal production at a 16-year low. By the end of Chávez's presidency in 2013, the number of Venezuelans in inadequate housing had grown to 3 million.

Under the Maduro government, housing shortages continued to worsen. Maduro announced in 2014 that due to the shortage of steel, abandoned cars and other vehicles would be acquired by the government and melted to provide rebar for housing. In April 2014, Maduro ruled by decree that Venezuelans who owned three or more rental properties would be forced by the government to sell their rental units at a set price or they would face fines or have their property possessed by the government. By 2016, residents of government-provided housing, who were usually supporters of the government, began protesting due to the lack of utilities and food.

Social

Crime

Escalating violent crime, especially murder, had been called "perhaps the biggest concern" of Venezuelans during the crisis. According to The New Yorker magazine Venezuela had "by various measures, the world's highest violent-crime rate" in 2017, and almost none of crimes that are reported are prosecuted. InSight Crime says the crisis has "all too often been obscured by the government's reluctance to release damning crime statistics". The New Yorker reporter found that even stairwells in a public hospital were not safe from robbers, who preyed on staff and patients despite the large number of security forces guarding the hospital, saying this was because the police were assigned to contain journalists who might embarrass the government with exposés on the state of the hospital; they were not assigned to protect its occupants. The police allegedly collaborated with the robbers receiving a cut of what they stole.

According to The U.S. Bureau of Diplomatic Security, street gang violence, "corrupt" underpaid police officers, "an inefficient and politicized judicial system", an extremely troubled prison system, and an increased widespread of weaponry has resulted in the majority of criminal activity in Venezuela, with murder being the crime committed the most. The Bureau states that there were 73 daily violent deaths in 2018, and that the government "often attempts to refute or repudiate reports of increasing crime and murder rates; however, independent observers widely reject" the Venezuelan government's claims. The government says there were 60 daily homicides in 2016, and 45 daily in 2015, corresponding with Venezuela's downward economic spiral, according to NBC News; the OVV says the numbers are higher.

For 2015, the government says the rate of homicides was 70.1 per 100,000 people. The Venezuelan Observatory of Violence (OVV) says the rate was 91.8 homicides per 100,000 people (in 2015, the comparative U.S. number was 4.9 per 100,000 inhabitants). According to the World Bank, the 2016 homicide rate was 56 per 100,000, making Venezuela third in the world, after El Salvador and Honduras. OVV data has 23,047 homicides committed in Venezuela in 2018, a rate of 81.4 per 100,000 people, with the decline being attributed to emigration.

According to the Los Angeles Times,... carjack gangs set up ambushes, sometimes laying down nail-embedded strips to puncture tires of vehicles ferrying potential quarry. Motorists speak matter-of-factly of spotting body parts along roadways. ... While most crime victims are poor, they also include members of the middle and upper classes and scores of police and military personnel killed each year, sometimes for their weapons. ... "Before the thieves would only rob you," is a common refrain here in the capital. "Now they kill you."

As a response to the high rate of crime, the Venezuelan government banned private ownership of firearms by some individuals in 2012. El País reported in 2014 that Chávez had years earlier assigned colectivos to be "the armed wing of the Bolivarian Revolution" for the Venezuelan government, giving them weapons, communication systems, motorcycles and surveillance equipment to exercise control in the hills of Caracas where police are forbidden entry. In 2006, they received arms and funding from the state when they were brought under the government's community councils. Chávez eliminated the Metropolitan Police in 2011, turning security over to the colectivos in some Caracas barrios. Some weapons given to the groups include assault rifles, submachine guns and grenades. Despite the Venezuelan government's statements saying that only official authorities can carry weapons for the defense of Venezuela, colectivos are armed with automatic rifles such as AK-47s, submachine guns, fragmentation grenades, and tear gas.

During the 2014 Venezuelan protests against Maduro, colectivos acted against the opposition protesters. As the crisis intensified, armed gangs have taken control of cities. The Civil Association for Citizen Control said that more than half of those killed during the protests were killed by colectivos. Human Rights Watch described colectivos as "armed gangs who use violence with impunity" to harass political opponents of the Venezuelan government. Amnesty International calls them "armed pro-government supporters who are tolerated or supported by the authorities". During the 2019 Venezuelan blackouts in March, Maduro called on the armed paramilitary gangs, saying, "The time has come for active resistance". As blackouts continued, on 31 March, citizens protested the lack of electricity and water in Caracas and other cities; Maduro called again on the colectivos, asking them "to defend the peace of every barrio, of every block". Videos circulated on social media showing colectivos threatening protesters and shooting in the streets; two protestors were shot.

There is no reliable data on kidnapping in Venezuela and available data is considered an underestimate; it is against the law to pay ransom, and according to criminologists, at least 80% of kidnappings are not reported for fear of retaliation, or because relatives prefer to negotiate, hoping the hostage will be released and fearing they will be killed if authorities are contacted. Available data underestimates the amount of express kidnapping, where victims are typically released in less than two days after relatives pay a quick ransom. Most express kidnapping victims are released, but in 2016, 18 were killed. At least 80% of kidnappings occur in a limited area around Caracas and including Miranda State. In the areas where most kidnappings occur, the government set up so-called "peace zones" where official police withdrew and gangs took over; according to NBC News, "experts say the government has armed these groups ... [who] ... control large territories, financed through extortion and the drug trade".

Illegal mining creates pools of standing water that encourage mosquito breeding, a partial cause of the increase in malaria seen in Venezuela.

The murder rate in Venezuela had also decreased significantly between 2017 and 2019. In 2018, Venezuela's murder rate–described as the highest in the world–had begun to decrease to 81.4 per 100,000 people according to the Venezuelan Violence Observatory (OVV), with the organization stating that this downward trend was due to the millions of Venezuelans that emigrated from the country at the time. The murder rate declined even further to 60.3 in 2019.

Human rights

Repression and politically motivated detentions have risen to record levels in 2019. Foro Penal states that Venezuela has at least 900 political prisoners as of April 2019, with more arrests of people being held longer in poor conditions and on dubious charges. The human rights organization has documented more than 50 instances that include "sexual abuse, strangulation using plastic bags and the use of razor blades to cut detainees' feet". In the first three months of 2019, Foro Penal says 1,712 people were arrested and about two-thirds of those were held for more than 48 hours, the threshold used to classify a detainee as a political prisoner. Maduro calls those arrested members of "terrorist groups" and says his government will not hesitate to send them to prison. Juan Requesens and Roberto Marrero are examples of "purely political" arrests, according to their attorney. Increasingly high numbers of the detainees are working-class people, who have been driven to protest by the crisis.

The final published report addressed the extrajudicial executions, torture, forced disappearances and other human rights violations reportedly committed by Venezuelan security forces in the recent years. Bachelet expressed her concerns for the "shockingly high" number of extrajudicial killings and urged for the dissolution of the FAES. According to the report, 1,569 cases of executions as consequence as a result of "resistance to authority" were registered by the Venezuelan authorities from 1 January to 19 March. Other 52 deaths that occurred during 2019 protests were attributed to colectivos. The report also details how the Venezuelan government "aimed at neutralising, repressing and criminalising political opponents and people critical of the government" since 2016.

On 16 September 2020, the United Nations accused the Maduro government of crimes against humanity.

Emigration 

The exodus of millions of desperate impoverished Venezuelans to surrounding countries has been called "a risk for the entire region". Millions of Venezuelan people have voluntarily emigrated from Venezuela during the Chávez and Maduro presidencies. The crisis started during the Chávez presidency, but became much more pronounced during Maduro's term. Emigration has been motivated by economic collapse, expansion of state control over the economy, high crime, high inflation, general uncertainty, a lack of hope for a change in government, a failing public sector, and "shortages of basic necessities". The PGA Group estimates more than 1.5 million Venezuelans emigrated in the 15 years between 1999 and 2014; an estimated 1.8 million left in ten years through 2015.

The UN said that in the first part of 2018, about 5,000 Venezuelans were leaving Venezuela daily. A February 2019 UN reported estimated that 3.4 million Venezuelans have emigrated, and they expect another 1.9 million may emigrate in 2019. The UN estimates 2.7 million have gone to the Caribbean and Latin America. Most have gone to Colombia; estimates of Venezuelans emigrating to Colombia are 1.1 million, Peru 506,000, Chile 288,000, Ecuador 221,000, Argentina 130,000, and Brazil 96,000. This is in contrast to Venezuela's high immigration rate during the 20th century. Kevin Whitaker, the U.S. ambassador in Colombia, says, "Colombians, in their tens and hundreds of thousands, migrated to Venezuela in the '60s and '70s and '80s, when Venezuela was a wealthy country and Colombia was not so much. Now, more than 1 million Venezuelans, many of them since 2015, have gone to live in Colombia."

Alba Pereira, who helps feed and clothe about 800 walkers daily in Northern Colombia, said in 2019 she is seeing more sick, elderly and pregnant among the walkers. The Colombian Red Cross has set up rest tents with food and water on the side of the roads for Venezuelans. Venezuelans also cross into northern Brazil, where UNHCR has set up 10 shelters to house thousands of Venezuelans. Images of Venezuelans fleeing the country by sea have raised symbolic comparisons to the images seen from the Cuban diaspora.

In 1998, only 14 Venezuelans were granted U.S. asylum, and by September 1999, 1,086 Venezuelans were granted asylum according to the U.S. Citizenship and Immigration Services. The first wave of Venezuelan emigrants were wealthy and middle class Venezuelans concerned by Chávez's rhetoric of redistributing wealth to the poor; the early exodus of college-educated people with capital caused a brain drain.

Emigration especially increased during the Maduro presidency. This second wave of emigration consisted of lower class Venezuelans suffering directly from the economic crisis facing the country; thus, the same individuals whom Chávez attempted to aid were now seeking to emigrate, driven by worsening economic conditions, scarcity of food and medicine, and rising rates of violent crime. Tomás Pérez, who studies the Venezuelan diaspora at the Central University of Venezuela, said in 2018 that because "now everyone is poor", it is mostly poor leaving the country. Carlos Malamud, from a Spanish think tank, said Maduro is "using migration as a political weapon against the opposition". The scale of the crisis has surpassed in four years the Cuban exodus, in which 1.7 million emigrated over a period of sixty years; Malamud says "Latin American societies aren't prepared for such wide-scale arrivals".

Impacting the health care crisis in Venezuela, health care professionals are emigrating; a primary factor driving emigration to Colombia is the lack of "medicines, supplies, health providers, and basic health services" in Venezuela. Since 2017, the banking sector has seen 18,000 employees leave the country.

Economic 

Maduro's government stopped releasing social and economic indicators, so most data rely on estimates. The Institute of International Finance (IIF) stated in March 2019 that "Venezuela's economic collapse is among the world's worst in recent history". A chief economist of the IIF said the crisis resulted from "policy decisions, economic mismanagement, and political turmoil", saying it is on a scale that "one would only expect from extreme natural disasters or military confrontations". The April 2019 International Monetary Fund (IMF) World Economic Outlook described Venezuela as being in a "wartime economy". For the fifth consecutive year, Bloomberg rated Venezuela last on its misery index in 2019. The government's main source of income is oil, with output "plummeting due to lack of investment, poor maintenance and neglect", from which consultant Eduardo Fortuny expects will take 12 years to recover.

As of 2020 the Venezuelan government has liberalized many socialist or redistributive economic policies—price and currency controls, stringent labor laws—and brought a rapprochement with members of the local business community—especially Lorenzo Mendoza of the iconic Empresas Polar conglomerate (who is no longer denounced as a "thief," a "parasite" and a "traitor"), in exchange for an abandonment of political opposition by Mendoza. However, a "slight recovery" in economic activity in January 2020 reportedly "evaporated in February and March" due to "the fall in global oil prices and the coronavirus pandemic".

In 2020 most of Venezuelan Government Gold  Stock was moved to Turkey in case of invasion as a precaution and as of 2022 because of Russian and Ukrainian war escalated and oil prices highest level of 54 years USA and Venezuela started melting the ice for more oil production to effect the risen prices ( Levent Işıklıgöz,academic)

Business and industry 

A number of foreign firms have left the nation—often due to quarrels with the socialist government—including Smurfit Kappa, Clorox, Kimberly Clark and General Mills; the departures aggravate unemployment and shortages. Before the effects of the 2019 Venezuelan blackouts, the number of multinational companies in the industrial city of Valencia in Carabobo State had dropped from 5,000 when Chávez became president to a tenth of that.

Airline industry 
Domestic airlines are having difficulties because of hyperinflation and parts shortages, and most international airlines have left the country. Airlines from many countries ceased operating in Venezuela, making travel to the country difficult: Air Canada became the first international airline to cease Venezuela operations in March 2014 and was followed by Alitalia in April 2015.

Other airlines that have left are Aeroméxico, Avianca, Delta, Lufthansa, LATAM, and United Airlines. According to the International Air Transport Association (IATA), the Government of Venezuela has not paid US$3.8 billion to international airlines in an issue involving conversion of local currency to U.S. dollars. Airlines have left for other reasons, including crime against flight crews and foreign
passengers, stolen baggage, and problems with the quality of jet fuel and maintenance of runways. Aerolíneas Argentinas left in 2017, citing security reasons, and American Airlines, the last U.S. airline serving Venezuela, left on 15 March 2019, after its pilots refused to fly to Venezuela, citing safety issues. Currently, the only North American airline flying to Venezuela is Sunwing Airlines, with seasonal service to Margarita Island and Punto Fijo.

Following the increasing economic partnership between Venezuela and Turkey in October 2016, Turkish Airlines started offering direct flights from December 2016 connecting between Caracas to Istanbul (via Havana, Cuba) in an effort to "link and expand contacts" between the two countries.

Iranian airline Mahan Air (blacklisted by the U.S. government since 2011) began direct flights to Caracas in April 2019, "signifying a growing relationship between the two nations" according to Fox News.

In May 2019, the United States Department of Transport and Department of Homeland Security suspended all flights between Venezuela and the United States, due to safety and security concerns. The suspension affects mainly Venezuelan airlines flying to Miami, which are Avior Airlines, LASER Airlines and Estelar Latinoamérica.

Gross domestic product 
Estimated to drop by 25% in 2019, the IMF said the contraction in Venezuela's GDP—the largest since the Libyan Civil War began in 2014—was affecting all of Latin America.

In 2015 the Venezuelan economy contracted 5.7% and in 2016 it contracted 18.6% according to the Venezuelan central bank; after that, the government stopped producing data. Ecoanalítica, a Venezuelan consultant, told The Wall Street Journal that output had halved between 2016 and 2019. The IMF and AGPV Asesores Económicos, a consulting firm based in Caracas, estimate that GDP shrunk to $80 billion in 2018 from $196 billion in 2013, making the economy smaller than Guatemala's or Ethiopia's.

Inflation 

The annual inflation rate for consumer prices has risen hundreds of thousands of percent during the crisis. Inflation in Venezuela remained high during Chávez's presidency. By 2010, inflation removed any advancement of wage increases, and by 2014 at 69% it was the highest in the world. In November 2016, Venezuela entered a period of hyperinflation, with inflation reaching 4,000% in 2017; the Venezuelan government "essentially stopped" producing inflation estimates in early 2018. At the end of 2018, inflation had reached 1.35 million percent.

In the 2017 Christmas season, some shops stopped using price tags since prices would inflate so quickly. From 2017 to 2019, some Venezuelans became video game gold farmers and could be seen playing games such as RuneScape to sell in-game currency or characters for real currency; players could make more money than salaried workers by earning only a few dollars per day. Some of these "gold farmers" will use cryptocurrencies as an intermediary currency before converting into Bolivares, as indicated in this interview.

In October 2018, the IMF estimated that inflation would reach 10,000,000% by the end of 2019.

In early 2019, the monthly minimum salary was the equivalent of US$5.50 (18,000 sovereign bolivars)—less than the price of a Happy Meal at McDonald's. Ecoanalitica estimated that prices jumped by 465% in the first two-and-a-half months of 2019. The Wall Street Journal stated in March 2019 that the "main cause of hyperinflation is the central bank printing money to increase money supply, thus boosting domestic spending.", reporting that a teacher can buy a dozen eggs and two pounds of cheese with a month's wages.

In May 2019, the Central Bank of Venezuela released economic data for the first time since 2015. According to the release, Venezuela's inflation rate was 274% in 2016, 863% in 2017 and 130,060% in 2018. The new reports imply a contraction of more than half of the economy in five years, according to the Financial Times "one of the biggest contractions in Latin American history". Sources quoted by Reuters, said that China may have asked Venezuela to release the data to bring Venezuela into compliance with the IMF and make it more difficult for the IMF to recognise Juan Guaidó during the presidential crisis. The IMF said it was not able to assess the quality of the data as it had no contact with the Venezuelan government.

Shortages 

Shortages in Venezuela became prevalent after price controls were enacted according to the economic policy of the Hugo Chávez government. Under the economic policy of the Nicolás Maduro government, greater shortages occurred due to the Venezuelan government's policy of withholding United States dollars from importers with price controls. Some Venezuelans must search for food—occasionally resorting to eating wild fruit or garbage—wait in lines for hours and sometimes settle without having certain products.

Unemployment 

In January 2016 the unemployment rate was 18.1 percent and the economy was the worst in the world according to the misery index. Venezuela has not reported official unemployment figures since April 2016, when the rate was at 7.3 percent.

Unemployment was forecasted to reach 44% for 2019; the IMF stated that this was the highest unemployment seen since the end of the Bosnian War in 1995.

Venezuelan debt 

In August 2017 President of the United States Donald Trump imposed sanctions on Venezuela which banned transactions involving Venezuela's state debt including debt restructuring. The technical default period ended 13 November 2017 and Venezuela didn't pay coupons on its dollar eurobonds, causing a cross-default on other dollar bonds. A committee consisting of the fifteen largest banks admitted default on state debt obligations which in turn entailed payments on CDS on 30 November.

In November 2017, The Economist estimated Venezuela's debt at US$105 billion and its reserves at US$10 billion. In 2018, Venezuela's debt grew to US$156 billion and as of March 2019, its reserves had dropped to US$8 billion.

With the exception of PDVSA's 2020 bonds, as of January 2019, all of Venezuela's bonds are in default, and Venezuela's government and state-owned companies owe nearly US$8 billion in unpaid interest and principal. As of March 2019, the government and state-owned companies have US$150 billion in debt.

Oil industry 
By 2018 the political and economic troubles facing Venezuela had engulfed the El Tigre-San Tomé region, a key region for oil production in eastern Venezuela. Oil workers were fleeing the state-owned oil company as salaries could not keep up with hyperinflation, reducing families to starvation. Workers and criminals stripped vital oil industry equipment of anything valuable, ranging from pickup trucks to the copper wire within critical oil production components. Oil facilities were neglected and unprotected, crippling oil production and leading to environmental damage. As noted petroleum historian, expert, and former San Tomé resident Emma Brossard stated in 2005, "Venezuelan oil fields had a depletion rate of 25 per cent annually [and] there had to be an investment of US$3.4 billion a year to keep up its production." "But since Chávez has become president there has been no investment."

As of 2020 there were no longer any oil rigs searching for oil in Venezuela, and production has been "reduced to a trickle". Oil exports are expected to total $2.3 billion for 2020, continuing a decline of more than a decade. Pollution from crude oil leaking from abandoned underwater wells and pipelines has caused serious damage to fishing and human health.

In 2022, rising oil prices caused by the Russian invasion of Ukraine, the World Oil Commission started meetings with the Venezuelan Government to push oil production to have a control over the price.

Public opinion

A November 2016 Datincorp survey that asked Venezuelans living in urban areas which entity was responsible for the crisis, 59% blamed chavismo or the presidents (Chávez, 25%; Maduro 19%; Chavismo 15%) while others blamed the opposition (10%), entrepreneurs (4%) and the United States (2%).

A September 2018 Meganálisis survey found that 84.3% of Venezuelans approved of a multinational foreign intervention on the condition that the coalition provide food and medicine. David Smilde from the Washington Office on Latin America said that "In November 2018, I worked with Datanálisis, one of Venezuela's most respected polling companies, to add several questions about military intervention and potential negotiations to its nationwide tracking poll. When asked whether they would support 'a foreign military intervention to remove President Maduro from his position,' only 35 percent said yes."

An 11–14 March 2019 survey of 1,100 people in 16 Venezuelan states and 32 cities by Meganálisis found that 89% of respondents wanted Maduro to leave the presidency. A Datanálisis poll on 4 March 2019 found Maduro's approval rating at an all-time low of 14%.

According to Datanálisis, in early 2019, 63% of Venezuelans believed that a change of government was possible. Fourteen months later, in May 2020, after the Macuto Bay raid, the percentage decreased to 20%.

According to economists interviewed by The New York Times, the situation is by far the worst economic crisis in Venezuela's history, and is also the worst facing a country in peace time since the mid-20th century. The crisis is also more severe than that of the United States during the Great Depression, the 1985–1994 Brazilian economic crisis, or the 2008–2009 hyperinflation in Zimbabwe. Other writers have also compared aspects of the crisis, such as unemployment and GDP contraction, to that of Bosnia and Herzegovina after the 1992–1995 Bosnian War, and those in Russia, Cuba and Albania following the collapse of the Eastern Bloc in 1989 and the dissolution of the Soviet Union in 1991.

Reaction

Economic sanctions 

The European Union, the Lima Group, the United States and other countries have applied individual sanctions against government officials and members of both the military and security forces as a response to human rights violations, corruption, degradation in the rule of law and repression of democracy. The United States would later extend its sanctions to the petroleum sector.

Economists have stated that shortages and high inflation in Venezuela began before US sanctions were directed towards the country. The Wall Street Journal said that economists place the blame for Venezuela's economy shrinking by half on "Maduro's policies, including widespread nationalizations, out-of-control spending that sparked inflation, price controls that led to shortages, and widespread graft and mismanagement." The Venezuelan government has stated that the United States is responsible for its economic collapse. The HRW/Johns Hopkins report noted that most sanctions are "limited to canceling visas and freezing assets of key officials implicated in abuses and corruption. They in no way target the Venezuelan economy." The report also stated that the 2017 ban on dealing in Venezuelan government stocks and bonds allows exceptions for food and medicine, and that the 28 January 2019 PDVSA sanctions could worsen the situation, although "the crisis precedes them". The Washington Post stated that "the deprivation long predates recently imposed US sanctions".

In 2011, the United States sanctioned Venezuela's state-owned oil company Petróleos de Venezuela. According to executives within the company as well as the Venezuelan government, the sanctions were mostly symbolic and had little effect (if any) on Venezuela's trade with the US since the company's sale of oil to the US and the operations of its US-based subsidiary Citgo were unaffected. On 9 March 2015, Barack Obama signed and issued an executive order declaring Venezuela a national security threat and ordered sanctions against Venezuelan officials. The sanctions did not affect Venezuela's oil company and trade relations with the US continued. In 2017, Trump's administration imposed additional economic sanctions on Venezuela. In 2018, the United Nations High Commissioner for Human Rights (OHCHR) documented that "information gathered indicates that the socioeconomic crisis had been unfolding for several years prior to the imposition of these sanctions".

According to The Wall Street Journal, new 2019 sanctions, aimed at depriving the Maduro government of petroleum revenues, are the most significant sanctions to date, and are likely to affect the Venezuelan people. In 2019, former UN rapporteur Alfred de Zayas said that US sanctions on Venezuela were illegal as they constituted economic warfare and "could amount to 'crimes against humanity' under international law". His report, which he says was ignored by the UN, was criticized by the Latin America and Caribbean programme director for the Crisis Group for neglecting to mention the impact of a "difficult business environment on the country", which the director said "was a symptom of Chavismo and the socialist governments' failures", and that "Venezuela could not recover under current government policies even if the sanctions were lifted." Michelle Bachelet updated the situation in a 20 March oral report following the visit of a five-person delegation to Venezuela, saying that the social and economic crisis was dramatically deteriorating, the government had not acknowledged or addressed the extent of the crisis, and she was concerned that although the "pervasive and devastating economic and social crisis began before the imposition of the first economic sanctions", the sanctions could worsen the situation.

In February 2019, Jorge Arreaza, Maduro's Minister for Foreign Affairs, said he was forming a coalition of diplomats who "believe the U.S. and others are violating the U.N. charter against non-interference in member states". During the announcement, he was surrounded by diplomats from 16 other countries, including Russia, China, Iran, North Korea, and Cuba. Arreaza said the cost to the Venezuelan economy of the US blockade was over $30 billion. Reporting on Arreaza's statements, the Associated Press said that Maduro was blocking aid, and "saying that Venezuelans are not beggars and that the move is part of a U.S.-led coup".

During the COVID-19 pandemic, world leaders called for a suspension of economic sanctions, including against Venezuela and Iran, that have "increasingly become the pursuit of war by other means". The US responded by intensifying the sanctions against Venezuela. United States Attorney General William Barr called the pandemic "good timing" since he believed it would make regime change more likely. Barr said that "[t]he people in Venezuela are suffering, and they need an effective government that responds to the people".

An October 2020 report published by the Washington Office on Latin America (WOLA) by Venezuelan economist Luis Oliveros found that "while Venezuela's economic crisis began before the first U.S. sectoral sanctions were imposed in 2017, these measures 'directly contributed to its deep decline, and to the further deterioration of the quality of life of Venezuelans' ". The report concluded that economic sanctions "have cost Venezuela's government as much as $31 billion since 2017"

Alena Douhan, United Nations special rapporteur on the negative impact of unilateral coercive measures, was due to visit Venezuela in August 2020 to investigate the impact of international sanctions. Before her visit, 66 Venezuelan NGOs (including PROVEA) asked Douhan in an open letter to consider the harmful impact of sanctions in the context of years of repression, corruption and economic mismanagement that predate the sanctions, and requested she meet independent press and civil society researchers. She arrived on 31 January, and was welcomed on arrival by a government minister and the Venezuelan ambassador to the UN. She declared on her preliminary findings as she left on 12 February: that sanctions against Venezuela have had a "devastating" noticeable impact in both the economy and the population. She said "the increasing number of unilateral sanctions imposed by United States, the European Union and other countries have exacerbated the economic and humanitarian calamities in Venezuela" but that Venezuela's economic decline "began in 2014 with the fall in oil prices" and that "mismanagement and corruption had also contributed." The government welcomed the report, while the opposition accused her of "playing into the hands of the regime" of Maduro. Douhan was harshly criticized by the Venezuelan civil society, and several non-governmental organizations pronounced themselves in social media with the hashtag "#Lacrisisfueprimero" (The crisis came first).

Foreign involvement 

On 11 August 2017, President Trump said that he is "not going to rule out a military option" to confront the autocratic government of Nicolás Maduro and the deepening crisis in Venezuela. Military Times said the unnamed aides told Trump it was not wise to even discuss a military solution due to the history of unpopular intervention in Latin America by the United States. Venezuela's Defense Minister Vladimir Padrino criticized Trump for the statement, calling it "an act of supreme extremism" and "an act of madness". The Venezuelan communications minister, Ernesto Villegas, said Trump's words amounted to "an unprecedented threat to national sovereignty".

Representatives of the United States were in contact with dissident Venezuelan military officers during 2017 and 2018 but declined to collaborate with them or provide assistance to them. The opinion of other Latin American nations was split with respect to military intervention. Luis Almagro, the Secretary General of the Organization of American States, while visiting Colombia, did not rule out the potential benefit of the use of military force to intervene with the crisis. Canada, Colombia and Guyana, which are members of the Lima Group, refused to sign the organization's document rejecting military intervention in Venezuela.

During the 2019 Venezuelan presidential crisis, allegations of potential United States military involvement began to circulate, with military intervention in Venezuela was already being executed by the governments of Cuba and Russia. According to professor Erick Langer of Georgetown University, while it was being discussed whether the United States would militarily intervene, "Cuba and Russia have already intervened". Hundreds or thousands of Cuban security forces have allegedly been operating in Venezuela while professor Robert Ellis of United States Army War College described the between several dozen and 400 Wagner Group mercenaries provided by Russia as the "palace guard of Nicolás Maduro". Kremlin spokesman Dmitry Peskov denied the deployment of Russian mercenaries, calling it "fake news". On 2 April 2019, the Russian Foreign Ministry rejected Trump's call to "get out" saying their 100 military servicemen now in Venezuela will support Maduro "for as long as needed".

Humanitarian aid 

Throughout the crisis, humanitarian aid was provided to Venezuelans in need both within Venezuela and abroad. In October 2018, the USNS Comfort departed for an eleven-week operation in Latin America, with a primary mission being to assist countries who received Venezuelan refugees who fled the crisis in Venezuela. The main goal was to relieve health systems in Colombia, Ecuador, Peru and other nations which faced the arrival of thousands of Venezuelan migrants.

At the end of January 2019, as the US prepared to bring aid across the border, the International Committee of the Red Cross warned the United States about the risk of delivering humanitarian aid without the approval of the government's security forces. The UN similarly warned the US about politicising the crisis and using aid as a pawn in the power struggle. Other humanitarian organisations also raised risks.

On 23 February 2019, 14 trucks carrying 280 tons of humanitarian aid attempted to bring aid across the Simon Bolivar and Francisco de Paula Santander bridges from Colombia. There were clashes, with Venezuelan security forces reported to use tear gas attack in attempt to maintain a blockade of the border. Colombia said around 285 people were injured and at least two trucks set on fire. CNN reported that the Venezuela government accused Guaidó supporters of burning the trucks and noted that "While a CNN team saw incendiary devices from police on the Venezuelan side of the border ignite the trucks, the network's journalists are unsure if the trucks were burned on purpose." In March, The New York Times reported that footage showed that it was anti-Maduro protestors rather than Venezuelan security forces who were responsible for the burning trucks. The New York Times reported that the trucks had been set on fire by anti-Maduro protester who threw a Molotov cocktail that hit one of the trucks. Colombian foreign minister Carlos Holmes Trujillo rejected the claims by The New York Times that the Colombian government manipulated the video of the burning of the aid truck, insisting that Nicolás Maduro was responsible. Responding when asked about the claims in a BBC interview, Juan Guaidó stressed that its findings suggested only a possible theory, that it was the newspaper's point of view and that a total of three trucks were burned, while the footage focused on one. Journalist Karla Salcedo Flores denounced state-run Telesur for plagiarism and the manipulation of her photos for propaganda purposes after the network claimed protesters poured gasoline on the trucks. Agence France-Presse published an investigation disproving Telesur's claims with the photos. Bellingcat reported that since the open source evidence examined for its investigation does not show the moment of ignition, it is not possible to make a definitive determination regarding the cause of the fire.

Franceso Rocca, president of the International Federation of Red Cross and Red Crescent Societies, announced on 29 March 2019 that the Red Cross was preparing to bring humanitarian aid to the country to help ease both the chronic hunger and the medical crisis. The Guardian reported that Maduro had "long denied the existence of a humanitarian crisis, and on 23 February blocked an effort led by Guaidó to bring aid into the country", and that the Red Cross had "brokered a deal" between the Maduro and Guaidó administrations "indicating a seldom-seen middle ground between the two men".

The Red Cross aid shipments were expected to begin within a few weeks, and the first shipment would help about 650,000 people; simultaneously, a leaked UN report estimated that seven million Venezuelans were likely in need of humanitarian assistance. During what The Wall Street Journal called "Latin America's worst humanitarian crisis ever", the "operation would rival Red Cross relief efforts in war-torn Syria, signaling the depth of Venezuela's crisis." Rocca said the efforts would focus first on hospitals, including state-run facilities, and said the Red Cross was open to the possibility of delivering aid products stored on the Venezuelan borders with Colombia and Brazil. He warned that the Red Cross would not accept any political interference, and said the effort must be "independent, neutral, impartial and unhindered".

Maduro and Arreaza met with representative of Red Cross International on 9 April to discuss the aid effort. The Wall Street Journal said that the acceptance of humanitarian shipments by Maduro was his first acknowledgement that Venezuela is "suffering from an economic collapse", adding that "until a few days ago, the government maintained there was no crisis and it didn't need outside help". Guaidó said the acceptance of humanitarian aid was the "result of our pressure and insistence", and called on Venezuelans to "stay vigilant to make sure incoming aid is not diverted for 'corrupt' purposes".

The first Red Cross delivery of supplies for hospitals arrived on 16 April, offering an encouraging sign that the Maduro administration would allow more aid to enter. Quoting Tamara Taraciuk—an expert at Human Rights Watch on Venezuela—who called the situation "a completely man-made crisis", The New York Times said the aid effort in Venezuela presented challenges regarding how to deliver aid in an "unprecedented political, economic and humanitarian crisis" that was "caused largely by the policies of a government intent on staying in power, rather than war or natural disaster". According to The New York Times, "armed pro-government paramilitaries]" fired weapons to disrupt the first Red Cross delivery, and officials associated with Maduro's party told the Red Cross to leave.

An April 2021 report by the inspector general at United States Agency for International Development found that the Trump administration had politicized the early 2019 humanitarian aid package and was motivated by regime change in Venezuela more so than ameliorating the humanitarian situation there.

See also 
 Fuel shortages in Venezuela
Pemon conflict - a theatre of the Venezuelan crisis

Notes

References

External links
 

 
2000s economic history
2010s economic history
2020s economic history
2000s in politics
2010s in politics
2020s in politics
2000s in Venezuela
2010s in Venezuela
2020s in Venezuela
Economic collapses
Economic history of Venezuela
Political history of Venezuela
Hugo Chávez